John Burnaby (28 July 1891 – 6 March 1978) was an Anglican priest and Regius Professor of Divinity at the University of Cambridge. He was married to Dorothy Helen Burnaby, née Lock, the sister of Robert Heath Lock. He is buried with his wife in the Parish of the Ascension Burial Ground in Cambridge.

References 
 ‘BURNABY, Rev. Prof. John’, Who Was Who, A & C Black, an imprint of Bloomsbury Publishing plc, 1920–2008; online edn, Oxford University Press, Dec 2012 ; online edn, Nov 2012 accessed 8 March 2013

External links
 
 

1891 births
1978 deaths
20th-century Church of England clergy
Fellows of Trinity College, Cambridge
Regius Professors of Divinity (University of Cambridge)
People educated at Haileybury and Imperial Service College